Top Chef is an American reality competition television series which premiered on March 8, 2006, on Bravo. The show features chefs competing against each other in various culinary challenges. They are judged by a panel of professional chefs and other notables from the food and wine industry with one or more contestants eliminated in each episode. Since its inception, the series has aired over 250 episodes.

Series overview 
<onlyinclude>

Episodes

San Francisco (Season 1)

Los Angeles (Season 2)

Miami (Season 3)

Chicago (Season 4)

New York (Season 5)

Las Vegas (Season 6)

D.C. (Season 7)

All-Stars (Season 8)

Texas (Season 9)

Seattle (Season 10)

New Orleans (Season 11)

Boston (Season 12)

California (Season 13)

Charleston (Season 14)

Colorado (Season 15)

Kentucky (Season 16)

All-Stars L.A. (Season 17)

Portland (Season 18)

Houston (Season 19)

World All-Stars (Season 20)

References

Lists of American non-fiction television series episodes